The 2006–07 Washington Wizards season was their 46th season in the National Basketball Association. The Wizards made the playoffs for the third straight season. The Wizards were then eliminated for the second straight time by the Cavaliers in just the first round. The Wizards had the fourth best team offensive rating and the third worst team defensive rating in the NBA.

Key dates prior to the start of the season:
 The 2006 NBA draft took place in New York City on June 28.
 The free agency period begins in July.

Offseason

Draft picks
Washington's selections from the 2006 NBA draft in New York City.

Roster

Regular season

Standings

Record vs. opponents

Game log

November 
Record: 5–9; Home: 5–2; Road: 0–7

December 
Record: 12–4; Home: 6–1; Road: 6–3

January 
Record: 10–5; Home: 7–1; Road: 3–4

February 
Record: 4–7; Home: 3–4; Road: 1–3

March 
Record: 7–8; Home: 5–2; Road: 2–6

April 
Record: 3–8; Home: 0–5; Road: 3–3

 Green background indicates win.
 Red background indicates loss.

Playoffs

Game log

|- bgcolor="#ffcccc"
| 1 || April 22 || @ Cleveland || L 82–97 || Antawn Jamison (28) || Antawn Jamison (14) || Antonio Daniels (11) ||Quicken Loans Arena20,562 || 0–1
|- bgcolor="#ffcccc"
| 2 || April 25 || @ Cleveland || L 102–109 || Antawn Jamison (31) || Antawn Jamison (10) || Antonio Daniels (11) ||Quicken Loans Arena20,562 || 0–2
|- bgcolor="#ffcccc"
| 3 || April 28 || Cleveland || L 92–98 || Antawn Jamison (38) || Antawn Jamison (11) || Antonio Daniels (13) ||Verizon Center20,173 || 0–3
|- bgcolor="#ffcccc"
| 4 || April 30 || Cleveland || L 90–97 || Antawn Jamison (31) || Antonio Daniels (6) || Antonio Daniels (12) ||Verizon Center20,173 || 0–4
|-

Player stats

Regular season

Playoffs

Awards and records

Awards
 Gilbert Arenas, All-NBA Second Team

Records

Milestones

Transactions
The Wizards have been involved in the following transactions during the 2006–07 season.
Transactions listed are from July 1, 2006, to June 30, 2007.

July 19, 2006- Signed Darius Songaila as a free agent.

August 5, 2006- Signed DeShawn Stevenson as a free agent.

September 13, 2006- Signed Roger Mason as a free agent.
Signed Kevinn Pinkney as a free agent.

September 14, 2006- Signed James Lang as a free agent.

October 10, 2006- Waived Kevinn Pinkney.

February 28, 2007- Signed Mike Hall to two 10-day contracts, then signed to a contract for the rest of the season.
Waived James Lang.

June 28, 2007- Drafted Nick Young in the 1st round (16th pick) of the 2007 NBA Draft.
Drafted Dominic McGuire in the 2nd round (47th pick) of the 2007 NBA Draft.

Trades

Free agents

See also
 2006–07 NBA season

References

Washington Wizards seasons
Wash
Wash